Nordin Mohd Jadi (born 12 May 1962 in Muar, Johor, Malaysia) is a former Malaysia track runner and athlete who represented Malaysia in many international and regional events and championships in the 1980s. His favourite athletic events were the 200 metre and 400 metre track events.

Achievement in Olympic Games
Nordin represented Malaysia in the 1984 Summer Olympics in Los Angeles and  the 1988 Summer Olympics in Seoul. His personal best for the 200m event was 21.4 seconds, made in 1983. For the 400m event it was 46.56 seconds, made in 1987.

Nordin Jadi was also the flag bearer for the Malaysia contingent during the march past in the opening ceremony of the Seoul, 1988 Summer Olympic Games.

See also
 Malaysia at the 1984 Summer Olympics
 Athletics at the 1984 Summer Olympics – Men's 200 metres Qualifying Heats 2 - Rank 5 - Nordin Mohamed Jadi - 21.88
 Athletics at the 1984 Summer Olympics – Men's 400 metres Preliminary Heats 2 - Rank 5 - Nordin Jadi - 47.12
 Athletics at the 1985 Southeast Asian Games - Medals by event - Athletic - Men 400m - Gold
 Muar - Notable and Famous Prominent Persons from Muar - Sportspersons

References

External links
 National Sports Council 1984 Olympic Results

Living people
1962 births
People from Muar
People from Johor
Malaysian people of Malay descent
Malaysian male sprinters
Olympic athletes of Malaysia
Athletes (track and field) at the 1984 Summer Olympics
Athletes (track and field) at the 1988 Summer Olympics
Southeast Asian Games medalists in athletics
Southeast Asian Games gold medalists for Malaysia
Competitors at the 1985 Southeast Asian Games